Safirullah Siddiqui, commonly known as Lehri (2 January 1929 – 13 September 2012), was a Pakistani comedian and an actor in the Urdu film industry of Pakistan. He is still considered one of the most acclaimed comedians of South Asia. Lehri is also known as the comedy king in the Pakistan film industry. He won 12 Nigar Awards for "Best Comedian" from 1963 to 1982.

Early life
Safirullah was born on 2 January 1929 in Kanpur, British India. After independence, he along with his family migrated to Pakistan and settled in Karachi. He performed on radio and stage before entering the film industry.

Works
Lehri acted from the late 1950s until the 1980s. He won the Nigar Award 11 times for various films between 1964 and 1986; his first film, Anokhi, was released in 1956, and his last production was Dhanak in 1986. The vast majority of his films have been in Urdu, though he did perform in a few Punjabi productions.

Lehri's forte was the quip and in his monotone, his audience became used to finding a brand of quiet, almost surreptitious humour. To critics and to his fans, his restrained style came to personify the 'decency' of times gone by. After the mid-1980s, Lehri was reduced to occasional appearances on television and newspaper columns. By the time private-sector television arrived, though, the film industry was struggling and all that it had once encompassed was looked upon both with a sense of loss and with fondness.

Awards
Lehri won 11 Nigar awards, which is considered one of the most prestigious awards in Urdu and Lollywood film industry in Pakistan.

Pride of Performance Award by the President of Pakistan in 1996.

Death
Lehri retired in late 1986; after his retirement, his health started deteriorating, then Prime Minister Benazir Bhutto set up a monthly stipend for him of Rs. 2,500, which he continued to receive until his last days; however there was no increase in the amount until his death. He died on 13 September 2012 in Karachi, aged 83, from lung, kidney diseases, diabetes, high blood pressure and heart issues. He had been under treatment and was on ventilator due to prolonged illness in a private hospital at the time of his death. Lehri’s funeral prayers took place on the same evening at Masjid-e-Baitul-Mukkaram in Gulshan-e-Iqbal, and he was buried at the Yasinabad Graveyard, Karachi.

References

External links

1929 births
2012 deaths
Muhajir people
Nigar Award winners
Pakistani male comedians
Pakistani male film actors
Recipients of the Pride of Performance
Male actors from Karachi